was the nineteenth of the fifty-three stations of the Tōkaidō. It is located in what is now part of the Aoi-ku area of Shizuoka, Shizuoka Prefecture, Japan.

History
The post station of Fuchū-shuku was also a castle town for Sunpu Castle in the former Suruga Province.

The classic ukiyo-e print by Andō Hiroshige (Hōeidō edition) from 1831 to 1834 depicts travellers crossing the Abe River to the west of the post station. A woman is being carried in a kago, while other people are fording the stream on foot.

Neighboring post towns
Tōkaidō
Ejiri-juku - Fuchū-shuku - Mariko-juku

Further reading
Carey, Patrick. Rediscovering the Old Tokaido:In the Footsteps of Hiroshige. Global Books UK (2000). 
Chiba, Reiko. Hiroshige's Tokaido in Prints and Poetry. Tuttle. (1982) 
Taganau, Jilly. The Tokaido Road: Travelling and Representation in Edo and Meiji Japan. RoutledgeCurzon (2004).

References

Stations of the Tōkaidō
Stations of the Tōkaidō in Shizuoka Prefecture